Jagannath Barooah (1851–1907) is an Indian scholar, tea planter, philanthropist from Jorhat, Assam. He is known as the first graduate from upper Assam.

Early life 
He was born on 29 October 1851 in Rajhauli, Jorhat, to Hemadhar Barooah.

Education 
He studied Sanskrit in his fathers guidance and later got into Guwahati English Seminary in 1864. He passed Bachelor of Arts from Presidency University, Kolkata in 1872. As he became the first graduate and upper Assam, people used to call him "B.A. Jagannath".

Work 
After returning from Calcutta, Jagannath Barooah appeared successfully for the Native Civil Services in 1875.But some spark of an independent spirit made him pass up a coveted carrier in favour of Asaam Tea Cultivation.

Tea Estates 

 Letekujan tea estate
 Tipomia tea estate
 Bosabari tea estate

Jorhat Sarbajanik Sabha 
He was the founder of Social-Political organisation Jorhat Sarbajanik Sabha in 1884, who later played a major role in Independence of India.

Personal life 
His first wife was Lilawati. They had two children together Swarnasachi and Devendranath. After the death of Lilawati, he married Troilokeshwari.

Honours 

The British conferred upon him the title "Raibahadur" in 1902. The Assam Pride Jagannath Barooah College at Jorhat was named after him as an honour. The college was established in his cottage "Borpatra kutir" in 1930.

Death 
Jagannath Barooah went to Calcutta for a health check up in February 1907. He died there on 21 April after two months.

See also 

 Jagannath Barooah College

References 

People from Jorhat district
Presidency University, Kolkata alumni
Scholars from Assam
People from Assam
1851 births
1907 deaths